The blue hour (from French) is the period of twilight (in the morning or evening, around the nautical stage) when the Sun is at a significant depth below the horizon. During this time, the remaining sunlight takes on a mostly blue shade. This shade differs from the colour of the sky on a clear day, which is caused by Rayleigh scattering.

The blue hour occurs when the Sun is far enough below the horizon so that the sunlight's blue wavelengths dominate due to the Chappuis absorption caused by ozone. Since the term is colloquial, it lacks an official definition such as dawn, dusk, or the three stages of twilight. Rather, blue hour refers to the state of natural lighting that usually occurs around the nautical stage of the twilight period (at dawn or dusk).

Explanation and times of occurrence

The still commonly presented incorrect explanation claims that Earth's post-sunset and pre-sunrise atmosphere solely receives and disperses the sun's shorter blue wavelengths and scatters the longer, reddish wavelengths to explain why the hue of this hour is so blue. In fact, the blue hour occurs when the Sun is far enough below the horizon so that the sunlight's blue wavelengths dominate due to the Chappuis absorption caused by ozone.

When the sky is clear, the blue hour can be a colourful spectacle, with the indirect sunlight tinting the sky yellow, orange, red, and blue. This effect is caused by the relative diffusibility of shorter wavelengths (bluer rays) of visible light versus the longer wavelengths (redder rays). During the blue "hour", red light passes through space while blue light is scattered in the atmosphere, and thus reaches Earth's surface.

Blue hour usually lasts about 20–96 minutes right after sunset and right before sunrise. Time of year, location, and air quality all have an impact on the exact timing of blue hour. For instance in Egypt (every 21st of June), when sunset is at 7:59 PM: blue hour occurs from 7:59 PM to 9:35 PM. When sunrise is at 5:54 AM: blue hour occurs from 4:17 AM to 5:54 AM. Golden hour occurs from 5:54 AM to 6:28 AM and from 7:25 PM to 7:59 PM.

Blue hour in art

Blue hour photography 

Many artists value this period for the quality of the soft light. Although the blue hour does not have an official definition, the blue color spectrum is most prominent when the Sun is between 4° and 8° below the horizon. 

Photographers use blue hour for the tranquil mood it sets. When photographing during blue hour it can be favourable to capture subjects that have artificial light sources, such as buildings, monuments, cityscapes, or bridges.

See also
 Color temperature
 Green flash
 Golden hour (photography)

Notes

References

External links 

 Blue hour mobile application (iOS, Iphone/iPad)
 bluehoursite.com: Everything about Blue Hour and Night Photography (news, articles, tips and calculator)
 Twilight Calculator, Golden Hour/Blue Hour table

Earth phenomena
Parts of a day
Visibility
Night
Atmospheric optical phenomena